The Ohio and Erie Canalway National Heritage Area is a federally designated National Heritage Area in northeastern Ohio that incorporates the routes of the Ohio and Erie Canal, the Cuyahoga Valley Scenic Railroad, and portions of Cuyahoga Valley National Park.The heritage area follows the path of the canal along the Cuyahoga River  for  from Cleveland through Akron and Massillon to New Philadelphia, while the railway runs from Cleveland to Akron to Canton.

The Ohio & Erie Canalway National Heritage Area was established in 1996.  It is managed by the Ohio & Erie Canalway Association.

References

External links
 

Ohio and Erie Canalway National Heritage Area
1996 establishments in Ohio
National Heritage Areas of the United States
Protected areas established in 1996